Wan'an is a town under the administration of Santai County, Sichuan, China. , it has one residential community and six villages under its administration.

References 

Towns in Sichuan
Santai County